Pornografia is a 2003 Polish–French film directed by Jan Jakub Kolski. It is based on the 1960 novel of the same name by Witold Gombrowicz, set in Nazi-occupied Poland during World War II.

The film touches on themes such as European society of the 1940s as a whole, conspiracy theories, guerrilla warfare, the Nazi invasion, murder, suicide, as well as eroticism, guilt, and manipulation of youth by adults.

The score, composed by Zygmunt Konieczny, won the Georges Delerue Award at the Flanders International Film Festival in 2003.

Cast and characters
 Krzysztof Majchrzak as Fryderyk
 Adam Ferency as Witold
 Krzysztof Globisz as Hipolit
 Grażyna Błęcka-Kolska as Maria
 Grzegorz Damiecki as Waclaw Paszkowski
 Jan Frycz as Siemian
 Irena Laskowska as Amelia
 Sandra Samos as Henia
 Anna Baniowska as Weronika
 Kazimierz Mazur as Karol
 Jan Urbanski as Skuziak
 Magdalena Różczka as
 Henryk Niebudek as Hans
 Dariusz Toczek as
 Jerzy Chojnowski as Gustaw

References

External links
 

2003 films
Polish drama films
Films directed by Jan Jakub Kolski
Georges Delerue Award winners